Gubernatorial elections were held in Brazil on 2 October 2022 as part of the nationwide general elections to elect tickets with state governors and their vice governors (as well as the Governor of the Federal District and their vice governor). A second round was held on 30 October for states where no candidate was able to secure more than half of the votes in the first round.

Background 
The behind-the-scenes run for Governor in the state began after the 2020 Brazilian municipal elections, According to Brazilian electoral law, no one candidate can be declared before July 2022, until then all quoted persons to be candidates are called pre-candidates or potential candidates.

Overview

Information by state 
 2022 São Paulo gubernatorial election
 2022 Mato Grosso do Sul gubernatorial election
 2022 Minas Gerais gubernatorial elections
 2022 Rio de Janeiro gubernatorial election
 2022 Bahia gubernatorial election
 2022 Paraná gubernatorial election
 2022 Rio Grande do Sul gubernatorial election
 2022 Pernambuco gubernatorial election
 2022 Ceará gubernatorial election

References 

Gubernatorial elections in Brazil
2022 elections in Brazil
2022 Brazilian gubernatorial elections